You're Living All Over Me is the second studio album by American alternative rock band Dinosaur Jr. It was released on December 14, 1987, through SST Records.

A refinement of the formula introduced on the band's debut album Dinosaur, You're Living All Over Me features drawling vocals paired with loud guitars and driving rhythms. The album was well-reviewed upon release, and is now regarded as a high point of American rock in the 1980s.

Background 

The album's title was long rumored to have been a phrase uttered by singer/guitarist J Mascis in frustration at the cramped conditions of a lengthy tour. However, Mascis has denied this story.

"Poledo" is different from the rest of the album in that the first half is a low-fidelity recording of Lou Barlow singing and playing ukulele, much like he did with his own group Sebadoh, while the second half is a collection of sound collages and abstract noise pieces.

Release 
The album was originally issued when the band was still known as Dinosaur, before a lawsuit forced the name change to Dinosaur Jr. The album was recalled by SST a few months after release, and new copies were printed crediting the band as Dinosaur Jr. The band made a music video for the song "Little Fury Things", which was directed by Jim Spring and Jens Jurgensen.

NME published a rave review of You're Living All Over Me upon the album's 1987 release, with the magazine's Jack Barron declaring it "the most agape rock music to have come out of America this year" and calling the band "the missing link between Hüsker Dü and REM". Critic Robert Christgau gave the album a "B+" grade in The Village Voice and wrote, "All these growing malcontents want is a little structure and meaning in their lives. Is that so much to ask?"

Legacy 

The album is considered a classic of indie and alternative rock. In 1995, it was ranked fifth on Alternative Press magazine's "Top 99 Albums of '85 to '95" list. In 2005, it was placed at number 31 on Spins list of the 100 greatest albums from 1985 through to 2005. Pitchfork included You're Living All Over Me at number 40 on its 2002 list of the best albums of the 1980s, and at number 46 on a new edition of the list published in 2018. Beats Per Minute listed the record as the 17th-best album of the 1980s. Acclaimed Music ranked You're Living All Over Me as the 429th-most acclaimed album of all time. It was included in the book 1001 Albums You Must Hear Before You Die.

You're Living All Over Me has also proven to be greatly influential, especially on the shoegaze genre. Kevin Shields of My Bloody Valentine has named the album, among others, as an influence on his band's seminal You Made Me Realise EP; the two bands would eventually tour together. Several sources recognize the album's influence on Nirvana. The title of the song "Little Fury Bugs" from Death Cab for Cutie's 2000 album We Have the Facts and We're Voting Yes is a reference to "Little Fury Things".

In 2005, You're Living All Over Me was performed live in its entirety as part of the All Tomorrow's Parties-curated Don't Look Back series.

In 2011, Nick Attfield wrote a book about the album as part of Continuum's 33⅓ series.

Track listing

Personnel 
 Dinosaur Jr.
 J Mascis – guitar, percussion, lead vocals
 Lou Barlow – bass, ukulele, backing vocals, tape, lead vocals on "Lose" and "Poledo"
 Murph – drums

 Additional personnel
 Lee Ranaldo – backing vocals on "Little Fury Things"

 Production
 Wharton Tiers – production, engineering
 Dave Pine – engineering
 Maura Jasper – album cover artwork

References

External links 
 You're Living All Over Me (Adobe Flash) at Radio3Net (streamed copy where licensed)

1987 albums
Dinosaur Jr. albums
SST Records albums
Albums produced by Wharton Tiers
Merge Records albums